Altdorf West (b Nürnberg) station is a railway station in the western part of the municipality of Altdorf bei Nürnberg, located in the Nürnberger Land district in Middle Franconia, Germany. The station is on the Feucht–Altdorf line of Deutsche Bahn.

References

Nuremberg S-Bahn stations
Railway stations in Bavaria
Buildings and structures in Nürnberger Land